Viñón is one of six parishes (administrative divisions)  in Cabranes, a municipality within the province and autonomous community of Asturias, in northern Spain. 

Villages
 d'Arboleya
 Ñao
 La Puerte
 Valbuena
 Viñón

Parishes in Cabranes